Ellen Fairclough Building (French: Édifice Ellen-Fairclough) is an 18-storey (94 m) high-rise office building built in 1981. It is the 5th tallest building in Hamilton, Ontario, Canada. It is situated on the corner of King Street West and MacNab Street South, and is primarily used to house provincial government offices.

The building was first known as the Convention Centre when it first opened up in 1981. One year later in 1982, it was renamed the Ellen Fairclough Building. Ellen Fairclough was a Hamiltonian and the first female member of the Canadian Cabinet. Ellen Fairclough served under John Diefenbaker for 13 years in Parliament. She advocated for gender equality and fairer immigration policy. She died at 99 in 2004.

The Hamilton Convention Centre occupies the first 3 floors of this office tower (with the exception of the Ellen Fairclough Building's lobby and the shared loading dock, both located on the ground floor), and it is attached to the Art Gallery of Hamilton and FirstOntario Concert Hall. There is also an enclosed pedestrian bridge that crosses over King Street and attaches to the Lloyd D. Jackson Square mall and the Sheraton Hamilton hotel. The government building is also home to a courthouse and a citizenship & immigration office.

Images

See also
Hamilton Convention Centre
List of tallest buildings in Hamilton, Ontario

References

External links
Image: Ellen Fairclough Building, taken from Raise the Hammer 
Image #2: Ellen Fairclough Building (www.emporis.com)

Buildings and structures in Hamilton, Ontario
Office buildings completed in 1981
Government buildings completed in 1981